Joseph Lawrence  (1786April 17, 1842) was a member of the U.S. House of Representatives from Pennsylvania.

Early life
Joseph Lawrence (father of George Van Eman Lawrence) was born near Hunterstown, Pennsylvania.  He moved with his widowed mother to a farm in Washington County, Pennsylvania, in 1789, and attended the common schools.  He engaged in agricultural pursuits.

Pennsylvania House of Representatives
He was a member of the Pennsylvania House of Representatives from 1818 to 1824 and served as 53rd Speaker from December 7, 1819 to December 7, 1822.  On December 7, 1819, he was elected speaker with a vote of 56 of 93 representatives voting, out of 94 (other votes were: Phineas Jenks – 21, Rees Hill – 14, Wilson Smith – 1, William Lehman – 1).  On December 3, 1822, he was elected speaker with a vote of 65 (other votes were John Gilmore – 23 and Jacob Holgate – 8).  In the general election of 1820, he received 3,083 votes.

United States Congress
He was elected as an Adams candidate to the Nineteenth and Twentieth Congresses.  He was an unsuccessful candidate for reelection in 1828 to the Twenty-first Congress.  He was again a member of the Pennsylvania House of Representatives from 1834 to 1836.  He was nominated for the United States Senate in 1836, along with future President James Buchanan and others. He served as state treasurer in 1837.  He was an unsuccessful candidate for election in 1838 to the Twenty-sixth Congress.  He was elected as a Whig to the Twenty-seventh Congress and served until his death in Washington, D.C. He served as chairman of the United States House Committee on Roads and Canals during the Twenty-seventh Congress.

Other political activities
Lawrence served as chairman of the Democratic convention of PA state legislators in 1824. At the Whig Convention at Wheeling (in Virginia at the time but now West Virginia) in 1840, Lawrence was president of the Pennsylvania delegation.  He individually introduced all the soldiers who fought in the American Revolution who were present at the convention.

Death
His death occurred shortly after 11 am.  He had been ill for approximately two weeks prior to death; his eldest son and son's wife died weeks before him.

Memorial
On Monday, April 18, 1842, William Wallace Irwin of Pennsylvania took to the floor of the House of Representatives to announce Lawrence's death.  He followed with a eulogy.  This was the only business transacted in the House on that day.  After customary arrangements, the House adjourned for the day.  Lawrence is interred in the Congressional Cemetery.

See also
 Speaker of the Pennsylvania House of Representatives
 List of United States Congress members who died in office (1790–1899)

References

The Political Graveyard

Sources

1786 births
1842 deaths
Members of the Pennsylvania House of Representatives
People from Washington County, Pennsylvania
Speakers of the Pennsylvania House of Representatives
State treasurers of Pennsylvania
Burials at the Congressional Cemetery
Pennsylvania Democratic-Republicans
Pennsylvania National Republicans
National Republican Party members of the United States House of Representatives
Whig Party members of the United States House of Representatives from Pennsylvania
19th-century American politicians